Patrick Jesse Beach (born December 28, 1959) is a former professional American football tight end in the National Football League (NFL) for eleven seasons for the Baltimore/Indianapolis Colts, Philadelphia Eagles, and Phoenix Cardinals. He played college football at Washington State University in Pullman.

Early years
Born in Grants Pass, Oregon, Beach moved to Pullman with his family at age eleven. A three-sport athlete at Pullman High School (football, basketball, track & field), he played college football in town at Washington State University (WSU) under head coach Jim Walden.

Beach led the Cougars to the Holiday Bowl in 1981 and was selected by the Colts in the sixth round (140th overall) of the 1982 NFL Draft.

NFL career
In his second NFL season in 1983, Beach scored the Baltimore Colts' last touchdown in a 20–10 win over the Houston Oilers on December 18, a twelve-yard completion from Mike Pagel with less than two minutes remaining. The franchise relocated to Indianapolis prior to the 1984 season.

Following the 1987 season, Beach caught a two-yard touchdown pass in the Colts' divisional playoff game against the Cleveland Browns, a 38–21 loss. In his career, he totaled 163 catches for 1,558 yards, averaging 9.6 yards per catch, and caught 14 touchdowns.

Personal
Beach married high school friend Robyn Crawford in 2007.

References

External links

1959 births
Living people
People from Pullman, Washington
Sportspeople from Grants Pass, Oregon
Players of American football from Washington (state)
Players of American football from Oregon
American football tight ends
Washington State Cougars football players
Baltimore Colts players
Indianapolis Colts players
Philadelphia Eagles players
Phoenix Cardinals players